This is a list of blackened death metal bands. Blackened death metal is a subgenre of heavy metal.

Abominator
Acheron
Aeternus
Anaal Nathrakh
Akercocke
The Amenta
Angelcorpse
Arkhon Infaustus
Astarte
Aurora Borealis
Azarath
Behemoth
Belphegor
Bölzer
Crescent
Crionics
Demonic Resurrection
Devian
Devilish Impressions
Goatwhore
Hate

Hecate Enthroned
Immortal Bird
Kaoteon
Necrophobic
Necrowretch
Portal
Revenge
Rudra
Sinsaenum
Škan
Slugdge
Solace of Requiem
Symphony of Heaven
Teitanblood
Underoath (early)
Vesania
Weapon
Zyklon

References

Blackened death metal
Lists of death metal bands
Lists of black metal bands